She Has What It Takes is a 1943 American drama film directed by Charles Barton, which stars Jinx Falkenburg, Tom Neal, and Constance Worth.

Cast list
 Jinx Falkenburg as Fay Morris
 Tom Neal as Roger Rutledge
 Constance Worth as June Leslie
 Douglas Leavitt as Paul Miloff
 Joe King as Lee Shuleman
 Matt Willis as "One-Round" Beasley
 Daniel Ocko as Nick Partos
 George McKay as Mike McManus
 George Lloyd as "Shocker" Dodie
 Robert Homans as Capt. Pat O'Neal
 Joseph Crehan as George Clarke
 John H. Dilson as Chamberlain Jones
 Barbara Brown as Mrs. Walters
 Ann Evers as Janesy
 Harry Hayden as Mr. Jason
 Curly Wright as Tony

References

External links
 
 
 

1943 films
Columbia Pictures films
Films directed by Charles Barton
American drama films
American black-and-white films
1943 drama films
1940s English-language films
1940s American films